NUPT can stand for:

Nanjing University of Posts and Telecommunications, Chinese university
National Union of Press Telegraphists, former British trade union